Clix is a brand of malt liquor made by the Grand Valley Brewing Company in 1937. It is often credited as the first malt liquor brewed in the United States. At Gluek Brewing in Minneapolis, Minnesota, Alvin Gluek had a similar idea in 1942. The style is light in body, thin and sweetish in taste, and high in alcohol.

Brewery owner 'Click' Koerber is the creator of the process and owner of the patent that details the production of Clix malt liquor.

References

External links
Link to US Patent
A thorough history of Malt Liquor

American beer brands